Beilschmiedia elliptica, known as the grey walnut is a rainforest laurel growing in eastern Australia. The range of natural distribution is from Forster, New South Wales (32° S) to Fraser Island (25° S) in south eastern Queensland. Beilschmiedia elliptica grows in warm temperate and sub tropical rainforests. Not a rare species, but seldom identified in the rainforest.

Description 
A medium to large tree reaching to 30 metres tall and 90 cm in trunk diameter. The cylindrical trunk is reddish brown or grey, with raised dots and depressions in the bark. The tree's base is somewhat buttressed or flanged.

Shoots and stems hairy. The elliptic shaped leaves are alternate and not toothed, 8 to 10 cm long and 2 to 3 cm wide. Leaf venation is prominent on both sides, with a raised midrib and prominent intramarginal vein.

Cream flowers form in panicles from August to October. The fruit is a black round drupe with a glaucous bloom, 12 mm long with a single seed inside. Fruit ripe from February to April. As with most Australian laurels, removal of the fleshy aril is advised to assist seed germination, which is slow but fairly reliable with Beilschmiedia elliptica.

The fruit is eaten by a variety of birds, including rose-crowned fruit dove, topknot pigeon and white-headed pigeon.

References

 Floyd, A.G., Rainforest Trees of Mainland South-eastern Australia, Inkata Press 1989, 

Flora of New South Wales
Flora of Queensland
Laurales of Australia
elliptica
Trees of Australia